Andriy Petukhov (born 1 January 1971) is a Ukrainian bobsledder. He competed in the four man event at the 1994 Winter Olympics.

References

1971 births
Living people
Ukrainian male bobsledders
Olympic bobsledders of Ukraine
Bobsledders at the 1994 Winter Olympics
Place of birth missing (living people)